Phyloxin, pronounced as Pha-lo-xin, is a dye used to stain tissue for histologic examination. It is a water-soluble red to brown dye commonly used in the coloring of food, drugs, cosmetics and cells such as muscle.It is also called Acid red 98. The IUPAC name of it is dipotassium;2',4',5',7'-tetrabromo-4,7-dichloro-3-oxospiro[2-benzofuran-1,9'-xanthene]-3',6'-diolate. It has a molar mass of 829.63 g·mol−1 and a molecular formula of C20H4Br4Cl2K2O5.

The structure of Phloxin consists of five rings, with three rings being aromatic along with four Bromine (Br) atoms attached on two of the aromatic rings and two Chlorine (Cl) atoms attached to one of the aromatic ring structures.

Phloxine, in addition to being used as an inactive ingredient to provide color in industrial settings, is also used as a dental disclosing tablets, which aids the field of dentistry in identifying cavities and diagnoses. Phloxin also aids as an immobilized photosensitizer in microbiological research, including gram staining.

Synthesis

See also
HOPS stain

References

Staining dyes